Saint Prosdocimus (Prosdecimus) of Padua (d. November 7, ca. 100 AD) is venerated as the first bishop of Padua.  Tradition holds that, being of Greek origin, he was sent from Antioch by Saint Peter the Apostle.  He is thus often depicted in art with this Apostle.  The cathedral at Feltre is dedicated to him and Saint Peter the Apostle, and the artist Il Pordenone (c. 1483 - 1539) created a work depicting Prosdocimus with Peter.

He evangelized the region and is said to have founded the parish church at Isola Vicentina.

His tomb is situated at the basilica of Santa Giustina at Padua.  The chapel dedicated to him there was built over his tomb outside the walls of Padua. The church also once contained the relics of Prosdocimus's deacon, Saint Daniel, though these were moved to the Paduan church of Santa Sofia in the 11th century.

Prosdocimus is depicted in an altarpiece by Romanino, now in the Musei Civici di Padova, Padua. He holds the jug a water with which he baptized Justina.

References

External links

Saints of November 7: Prosdocimus of Padua

1st-century births
100 deaths
Saints from Roman Anatolia
Italian saints
Bishops of Padua
1st-century Italian bishops
1st-century Christian saints